Country Afternoon with Hugo Duncan is a country music radio programme, broadcast on BBC Radio Ulster Mondays to Fridays, 1.30pm-3pm. The show features interviews with country singers and performers, and Hugo regularly takes the show on the road around Northern Ireland to meet the listeners.

External links
Visit the Country Afternoon homepage
BBC Radio Ulster homepage

References 

Radio programmes in Northern Ireland